Ottery is a suburb in Cape Town, South Africa. It is on the edge of the Southern Suburbs.  The Youngsfield Military Base, Royal Cape Golf Club and Cape Town's 'official' China Town are located in the suburb.  Every year the Youngsfield Military Base in Ottery hosts the Cape Argus Junior Cycle Tour on 12 March.

Transport
There is an Ottery train station present and is on the Cape Flats line, which connects Heathfield to Cape Town via Athlone. The Ottery station was built in 1904 (finished on 1 February). The line was built for private use and was acquired as government property on 1 July 1908. The Golden Arrow busses pass the Ottery centre as well, part of the Wynberg to Khayelitsha route. Minibus taxi's pass through Ottery on Ottery Road, en route to Wynberg from Lotus River and Mitchells Plain respectively. More information can be found on the City's website.

Major retail stores

China Town
Launched in September 2008 the 'China Town' in Ottery is not a true Chinatown but is instead a   retail park with 48, predominantly Chinese-owned, retail units selling mostly Chinese imports.  The retail park cost R45 million to construct.

Ottery Centre
The Ottery Centre is a popular shopping centre in and around Cape Town's Southern suburbs. It is also one of the oldest shopping centres in the Southern suburbs. There are a host of shops available including a Pick n Pay Hypermarket with Pick n Pay liquor store, Spur, Nando's, clothing shops, a post office among others and there is also secure free parking. The Ottery Centre recently underwent an extensive refurbishment which made it more stylish and added to the shops available.

Makro
Makro has a branch in Ottery, one of three in the Western Cape, on the corner of Ottery and Old Strandfontein Road.

Geography 
Ottery is bordered by Plumstead to the west, Philippi to the east and Kenilworth to the north west. The suburb can be accessed from the M5 freeway to the west of the suburb.

Education

Schools
 Christel House School
 The Oracle Academy High School
 Kids Kampus Pre School
 Ferndale Primary
 Junior College
 Battswood Primary School

Higher
 Ottery School of Industries

Medical
 Jafmed Pharmacy
 The Good Hope Medical Centre

Public Service
 The Ottery Traffic Department is one of Cape Town's major traffic control and testing centres.
 Ottery Library is available on the corner of Bruce and Edwards Roads, contact: Patrick de Stadler - Tel: 021 400 4412

References

Suburbs of Cape Town